The Nojima Maru, also known as Noshima Maru or Nozima Maru, was an 8,215 ton coal ship, also used as troop transport ship by the Imperial Japanese Army (IJA) during World War II.

Built by Mitsubishi Heavy Industries in Kobe and launched in 1919, the Nojima Maru was part of the China Area Fleet in 1937, and operated off Shanghai in support of the fleet. The bow was blown off, but Nojima was saved by stranding herself in Hunghai Bay. It took one year to repair the ship.

On 1 March 1943, she left Rabaul, New Britain, as part of Operation 81, carrying 1,225 men of the IJA's 51st Division, the Navy's 3rd Air Defense Unit and 600 troops of the Special Naval Landing Forces (SNLF) for Lae, New Guinea. The convoy was attacked by aircraft of the United States Army Air Forces and Royal Australian Air Force from 2 March 1943, known as the Battle of the Bismarck Sea. On 3 March Nojima Maru was damaged both by aircraft and a collision with Japanese destroyer Arashio. Some 400 crew and troops were killed.

Notes

References

1919 ships
Ships built by Mitsubishi Heavy Industries
Maritime incidents in March 1943
Ships sunk by US aircraft
Shipwrecks in the Bismarck Sea
Troop ships of Japan